The name Ivy has been used for a total of sixteen tropical cyclones worldwide: eleven in the Western Pacific Ocean, two in the Southwest Indian Ocean and three in the Southwestern Pacific Ocean.

Western Pacific:
 Tropical Storm Ivy (1952) (T5207)
 Typhoon Ivy (1956) (T5617)
 Tropical Depression Ivy (1960) (01W, Japan Meteorological Agency analyzed it as a tropical depression, not as a tropical storm.)
 Typhoon Ivy (1962) (T6226, 76W)
 Typhoon Ivy (1965) (T6514, 18W, Pining)
 Tropical Storm Ivy (1967) (T6739, 41W)
 Tropical Storm Ivy (1971) (T7113, 13W) – struck Japan.
 Typhoon Ivy (1974) (T7410, 12W, Iliang) – struck Luzon and southeastern China.
 Typhoon Ivy (1977) (T7717, 17W)
 Typhoon Ivy (1991) (T9115, 17W) – approached Japan (ja) .
 Typhoon Ivy (1994) (T9419, 22W)

Southwest Indian Ocean:
 Cyclone Ivy (1966)
 Cyclone Ivy (1994)

Southwest Pacific Ocean:
 Cyclone Ivy (1972)
 Cyclone Ivy (1989)
 Cyclone Ivy (2004) – caused extensive damage in Vanuatu.

Pacific typhoon set index articles
South-West Indian Ocean cyclone set index articles
Australian region cyclone set index articles
South Pacific cyclone set index articles